The Trump Show is a BBC documentary series about Donald Trump, the 45th President of the United States. It first started airing on 15 October 2020 and concluded on 19 January 2021, the day before the Inauguration of Joe Biden.

Directed by Rob Coldstream, the series focuses on the Presidency of Donald Trump and all the controversies and challenges Trump faced in his four years in office (such as the Stormy Daniels scandal, his first impeachment trial, the COVID-19 pandemic, fabricated claims of election fraud, and the Capitol attack). It features interviews from Trump's friends, advisers and close observers.

Episodes

Subjects

Reception 
The Trump Show has received positive reviews from critics. On review aggregator Rotten Tomatoes, the series holds an approval rating of 86%. On IMDb, the series has a 7.8 rating. The Independent described the series as  "thoroughly entertaining".

References

External links 
 The Trump Show at BBC.
 

2020 American television series debuts
2021 American television series endings
2020s American documentary television series
2020s American television miniseries
English-language television shows
BBC television documentaries
Documentary films about Donald Trump